Thursday Island, colloquially known as TI, or in the Kawrareg dialect, Waiben or Waibene, is an island of the Torres Strait Islands, an archipelago of at least 274 small islands in the Torres Strait. Thursday Island is also the name of the town in the south and west of the island and also the name of the locality which contains the island within the Shire of Torres. The town of Rose Hill (known as Abednego until 7 September 1991) is located on the north-eastern tip of the island.

Geography 

While Thursday Island is within the Shire of Torres and is the administrative centre for that shire, it is also the administrative and commercial centre of the local government area of Torres Strait Island Region despite not being part of that local government area.

History

The island has been populated for thousands of years by the Torres Strait Islanders, though archeological evidence on Badu, further north in Torres Strait, suggests that the area has been inhabited from before the end of the last Ice Age. The archaeology from Badu, Pulu, Saibai and Mer shows that Melanesian occupation started around 2,600 years ago (see Kalaw Lagaw Ya).

In 1848 a hydrographic survey of the area was conducted by Captain Owen Stanley of the Royal Navy, the commander of HMS Rattlesnake. He named this island Friday Island and another island Thursday Island (presumably reflecting the day of the week on which he named them). However, in June 1855 Admiral Sir Francis Beaufort of the Royal Navy (the Admiralty Hydrographer) decided to switch the names around so the present-day Thursday Island would appear on the left of present-day Friday Island on a map.

The original place of permanent European settlement in Torres Strait was Somerset, south-east of the tip of Cape York Peninsula, established in 1864. However, the channel between Albany Island and Somerset proved to be hazardous for a port and in 1875 it was jointly decided by the Queensland and British governments to transfer the port to the deep anchorage on the south side of Thursday Island. The new port was called Port Kennedy, after Edmund Kennedy, the explorer of Cape York Peninsula, and was established in 1867. The town that developed on the island was also called Port Kennedy, but on 1 June 1962 the town was renamed Thursday Island.

In 1877, an administrative centre for the Torres Strait Islands was set up on the island by the Queensland Government and by 1883 over 200 pearling vessels were based on the island.

Pearl trade
A lucrative pearling industry was founded on the island in 1884, attracting workers from around Asia, including Japan, Malaya and India, seeking their fortune. The Japanese community was in part indentured divers and boat hands who returned to Japan after a period of service and some longer term residents who were active in boat building and in the ownership of luggers for hire—which was illegal but bypassed by leases through third parties back to other Japanese, a practice called "dummying". Additionally, many south Pacific Islanders worked in the industry, with some originally imported against their will, in a practice known as blackbirding. While the pearling industry has declined in importance, the mix of cultures is evident to this day. The pearling industry centred on the harvesting of pearl shell, which was used mainly to make shirt buttons. The local pearl oyster is Golden Lip Oyster, Pinctada maxima.

Shell trade
Trochus shell was also gathered using specialized boats. Most shell was exported as the raw material—to a London-based market. Pearls themselves were rare and a bonus for the owner or crew. The boats used were very graceful two-masted luggers. In shallow water free diving was used while in deeper water diver's dress, or an abbreviated form of it, with a surface air supply was used. In good times there were three divers to a lugger, a stern diver, one midships, and one diver off the bow. A manual air compressor was used. It looked like a yard-wide cube with two large wheels mounted one on each side.

For part of the fleet that operated further from Thursday Island, larger vessels, typically schooners were used as mother ships to the luggers. Shell was usually opened on the mother vessels rather than on the luggers, in order to secure any pearls found. The waters of the Straits are murky and visibility was generally very poor. Even though dive depths were not great, except at the Darnley Deep (near Darnley or Erub Island), which was 40 fathoms (240 feet), attacks of the bends were common and deaths frequent.

Telegraph, trade, and cyclone 
The Thursday Island Parish of the Roman Catholic Vicariate Apostolic of Cooktown (now the Roman Catholic Diocese of Cairns) was established in 1884.

On 25 August 1887, The Paterson (Cape York) Telegraph Station on the West Coast of Cape York was opened. It connected the Cape York Telegraph Line with Thursday Island, via an undersea cable.

In the late-19th and early-20th centuries Thursday Island was a regular stop for vessels trading between the east coast of Australia and Southeast Asia. A shipping disaster to a vessel in this service occurred in 1890 when  struck an uncharted reef in the Strait and sank in five minutes with the loss of over 130 lives. The Anglican Church on Thursday Island built shortly afterwards was named the Quetta All Souls Memorial Cathedral in memory of the event. Today the church is called All Souls and St Bartholomew Church.

Cyclone Mahina, which hit Bathurst Bay, southeast of Thursday Island in 1899, wrecked the pearling fleet sheltering there, with huge losses of vessels and lives.

Fort

The fear of Russian invasion as a result of the deterioration of relations between the Russian Empire and the British Empire led to a fort on Battery Point being built in 1892 to protect the island. The fort has not been in operation since 1927, but is today a heritage feature of the island.

Twentieth century

Local pearling declined steadily up to World War II, partly through competition from a Japanese-based fleet which did not use local resources or personnel. In the 1950s plastic buttons imitating pearl supplanted much of the demand for shell. Before the decline, pearl fishing was taken by the island-based fleet to the Aru Islands in what was then the Dutch East Indies.

The Thursday Island Customs House opened in 1938 at 2 Victoria Parade.

During World War II, Thursday Island became the military headquarters for the Torres Strait and was a base for Australian and United States forces. January 1942 saw the evacuation of civilians from the island. Residents of Japanese origin or descent were interned. The residents did not return until after the end of the war and many ethnic Japanese were forcibly repatriated. The island was spared from bombing in World War II, due, it was thought, to it being the burial place of many Japanese pearl shell divers, or possibly the Japanese thinking there were still Japanese residents on the island. However, neighboring Horn Island was extensively bombed. There was an airbase there, used by the Allies to attack parts of New Guinea. At the end of the war, the island tradition of a no-footwear policy was reinstated out of respect for the ancient spirits believed to reside on the island. After the war, an airline service was set up by Ansett Airlines from Cairns to TI twice a week, using de Havilland Dragon Rapides and later DC3s. Passengers disembarked on Horn Island and caught a ferry-boat over to TI, as they still do. The island was also served by a ship, the Elsana, which made the journey once a month. For a short period after the war Okinawan divers were used on the luggers but this was not a great success. 

In the 1950s, the CSIRO attempted to establish cultured pearl farms, but many were devastated by disease in the 1970s. The trigger is considered by some to be the use of dispersants on the 1970 oil spill from the tanker Oceanic Grandeur.  This industry still exists around the island today. In the 1970s, there was also an attempt to farm green turtles.

The Melanesian background of the Thursday Islanders became an issue in the 1970s, when Papua New Guinea sought to include some of the Torres Strait Islands within its borders. The Torres Strait Islanders insisted that they were Australians, however, and after considerable diplomatic discussion and political disputation between the Queensland and the Federal Governments, all of the Torres Strait islands, including Thursday Island, remained part of Australia.

From 1900 to 1996 the Quetta Memorial Church on the island was the cathedral church of the large Diocese of Carpentaria which included North Queensland, the Islands of the Torres Strait and, to 1968, Northern Territory.

Twenty-first century 

Heritage listings
Thursday Island has a number of heritage-listed sites, including:
 Chester Street: Green Hill Fort
Douglas Street: Quetta Memorial Precinct
 120 Douglas Street: Our Lady of the Sacred Heart Church
 Summers Street: Thursday Island Cemetery (incorporating the Japanese Cemetery & the Grave of the Hon. John Douglas)
 2 Victoria Parade: Thursday Island Customs House

The Gab Titui Cultural Centre (2004) on Thursday Island showcases both heritage and contemporary Islander artworks.

Economy
The Island is one of the two bases for the Torres Straits Pilots, a cooperative owned and run by qualified Master Mariners who pilot ships through the Straits and down to Cairns. This is a necessary service because navigation through the area is tricky due to the extensive reef systems.

The island has the area hospital and courts, is the regional centre for higher education, a centre for some research organisations and is the administrative base for the local, state and federal governments.
Banking and phones are available.

Thursday Island is only in part self-sufficient for water, some being piped from the adjacent island. It has two wind turbines which generate some of its electricity requirement.

The economy of the island is dependent on its role as an administrative centre and is supported by pearling and fishing, as well as a fast-developing tourism industry, with perhaps the most famous tourists being novelist Somerset Maugham and Banjo Paterson, and the most numerous being day-trippers from the cruise ships that call into the island each year.

Climate
 
Thursday Island has a tropical savanna climate (Köppen climate classification: Aw) with hot daytime temperatures and warm nighttime temperatures year round. The wet season typically runs from December through mid-May though occasionally rainfall occurs during the dry season.

Language
Torres Strait Creole is the dominant language spoken on Thursday Island by the Islanders, followed by Kalaw Lagaw Ya, commonly called Mabuiag (pronounced Mobyag) by many, although English is also spoken. The indigenous language is Kaiwaligau Ya, another dialect of Kalaw Lagaw Ya, otherwise known as Kowrareg, (or more correctly Kauraraigau Ya, the name used by the people in the mid to late 1800s).

Amenities
Thursday Island has number of services open to the community, including a sporting complex, gym, public library as well as ANZAC park and Ken Brown Oval.

There is a community pharmacy, general store, butcher, bank and many other essential services.

The Shire of Torres operates Ngulaig Meta Municipal public library at 121 Douglas Street. The current library facility opened in 2015.

Sacred Heart Catholic Church is in Douglas Street. It is within the Thursday Island Parish of the Roman Catholic Diocese of Cairns.

Education 
Tagai State College is a government primary and secondary (Early Childhood-12) school for boys and girls that operates 17 campuses throughout the Torres Strait, including two on Thursday Island. The Thursday Island primary school campus (Early Childhood-6) is at 31 Hargrave Street. The Thursday Island secondary school campus (7-12) is at 21 Aplin Road In 2017, the school across all location had a total enrolment of 1,554 students with 168 teachers (165 full-time equivalent) and 198 non-teaching staff (142 full-time equivalent). The school includes a special education program at Summers Street.

Our Lady of the Sacred Heart School is a Catholic primary (Prep-6) school for boys and girls at Normanby Street. In 2017, the school had an enrolment of 103 students with 12 teachers (9 full-time equivalent) and 13 non-teaching staff (9 full-time equivalent).

The Torres Strait Campus of the Tropical North Queensland TAFE Institute is located on the island next to the Tagai State College.

Notable people
Notable people who are from or who have lived on Thursday Island include:
 Charles Klapow (Choreographer)
 Henry Gibson "Seaman" Dan, award-winning Torres Strait Islander musician.
 John Douglas, Premier of Queensland (1877–79) and Government Resident on Thursday Island (1885-1904).
 Matthew Elliott, Australian professional rugby league football coach and former player
 Tiarna Ernst, professional AFLW and Western Bulldogs Premiership Player.
 Tommy Fujii, mother-of-pearl shell diver as a boy, later businessman
 The Mills Sisters, a group of three musical sisters, Rita and twins Cessa and Ina, who performed all over the Pacific and in Europe between the 1950 and late 1990s.
 Danny Morseu, professional basketball player
 Peter Ware, WAFL premiership winning footballer with Swan Districts.
 Jesse Williams, born on Thursday Island in 1990, the first indigenous Australian to receive a scholarship to play American football for the Alabama Crimson Tide.
 Ethel May Eliza Zahel (1877–1951), teacher and public servant.
Bernard Namok, designer of the Torres Strait Islander flag.
 Elma Gada Kris, dancer, choreographer, actor, NAIDOC award winner (2019) artist of the year.

See also

 List of Torres Strait Islands
 HMAS Carpentaria

References

Further reading

External links

 Island (Waiben) Thursday Island (Waiben)
 Glover's 1879 watercolour of Thursday Island
 
 Town map of Thursday Island, 1982
 Thursday Island and North Queensland photograph album, State Library of Queensland. Digitised photograph album, with photos dated between  1800 and 1900

Torres Strait Islands
Towns in Queensland
Torres Strait Islands communities
Islands of Far North Queensland
Aboriginal communities in Queensland
 
Queensland in World War II
Populated places in Far North Queensland
Shire of Torres
Localities in Queensland